John H. Adams House, also known as Davis Funeral Home, is a historic home located at High Point, Guilford County, North Carolina. It was built in 1918, and is a two-story, five bay, stuccoed frame structure in the Italian Renaissance style. It has a low pitched, deck-hipped roof with terra cotta, widely overhanging boxed eaves, and a three-bay recessed upper porch or loggia with semi-circular arches.

It was listed on the National Register of Historic Places in 2001. It is located in the Uptown Suburbs Historic District.

References

Buildings and structures in High Point, North Carolina
Houses on the National Register of Historic Places in North Carolina
Renaissance Revival architecture in North Carolina
Houses completed in 1918
Houses in Guilford County, North Carolina
National Register of Historic Places in Guilford County, North Carolina
Historic district contributing properties in North Carolina